Fayez Rashid Ahmed Hassan al-Qadi Banihammad (March 19, 1977 – September 11, 2001) was one of five hijackers aboard United Airlines Flight 175 as part of the September 11 attacks. 

He was one of two Emiratis to take part in the attacks, the other being Marwan al-Shehhi, who led the hijacking of Flight 175 and flew the plane into the South Tower of the World Trade Center.

Born in the United Arab Emirates, Banihammad left his family to pursue relief work. Using the Visa Express program, Banihammad obtained a U.S. tourist visa.

Banihammad arrived in the United States in June 2001. On September 11, 2001, Banihammad boarded United Airlines Flight 175 and participated in the hijacking of the plane so it could be crashed into the South Tower of the World Trade Center.

Early life 
Banihammad was from Khor Fakkan in the United Arab Emirates and was born to Muhammad Fayez Banihammad, a school principal. Banihammad typically went by the name "Ahmed".

2000 
Banihammad told his parents, while spending time in 'Asir, that he hoped to find work with the International Islamic Relief Organization. He only contacted his parents once after that. He is believed to have visited the Philippines for three days from October 17–20, 2000.

Banihammad, together with Saeed al-Ghamdi, gained entry to the US via the Visa Express program. Upon later review of his application, it was noticed that he had not listed an occupation or reason for visit, and when asked where he would be living in the country, simply wrote No. However, he still received the visa.

2001 
Before the pair arrived in Orlando, Florida on June 27, 2001, Banihammad had opened a bank account in the UAE to which $30,000 was deposited by unknown parties only two days before his arrival. He opened another account with SunTrust Banks in Orlando several days after his arrival, becoming one of nine hijackers to open an account with the bank.

Known as Abu Ahmed al-Imaraati during the preparations, the 9/11 Commission noted: "He appears to have played a unique role among the muscle hijackers because of his work with one of the plot's financial facilitators, Mustafa al-Hawsawi." On July 18, Banihammad gave Mustafa power-of-attorney over his Dubai bank account, and Mustafa reportedly mailed him a VISA and bank card.

Possibly a licensed pilot, a man with his name was registered as having trained at the Spartan Aeronautics School in Tulsa, Oklahoma, although the school denies that he ever attended, indicating a possible case of mistaken identity.

Attacks 

Fayez Banihammad purchased both his and Mohand al-Shehri's one-way first class tickets for United Airlines Flight 175 online on August 27 or 29, charging the $4464.50 to a Visa card from Mustafa al-Hawsawi, listing both of their addresses as a Mail Boxes Etc. in Delray Beach. This was not the same postal box used by Hamza and Ahmed al-Ghamdi who purchased their tickets for the same flight a day later with another Mailboxes Etc. postal box in Delray Beach, although both groups listed the same phone number.

Staying in the Milner Hotel in Boston, Massachusetts from September 8–10, Banihammad asked a hotel clerk to fill out the registration card for the room, citing his poor English. On September 10, 2001, he shared a room at the Milner Hotel with three other terrorists: Mohand al-Shehri, Marwan al-Shehhi, who would pilot Flight 175 into the South Tower of the World Trade Center, and Satam al-Suqami, a hijacker of Flight 11.

On September 11, Banihammad boarded Flight 175 and sat in first class seat 2A, next to al-Shehri in 2B. The plane took off at 8:14, and within 28 minutes the five hijackers began their assault. It is believed that Banihammad and al-Shehri forcibly entered the cockpit and murdered the pilots while the al-Ghamdi brothers forced the remaining crew and passengers towards the rear of the aircraft, allowing al-Shehhi to take control of the plane. At 9:03 a.m., only 21 minutes after the hijacking began, al-Shehhi flew the plane into the South Tower of the World Trade Center, obliterating all on-board instantly and killing or trapping hundreds of people inside the building. 55 minutes after the crash, at 9:58 a.m., the South Tower collapsed, killing all who were still inside the building and many more on the ground.

Aftermath 
After the attacks it was reported by ABC News that somebody with the same name had attended the Defense Language Institute at Lackland Air Force Base - a claim that may have been born of a false address Banihammad had used.

See also

 PENTTBOM
 Hijackers in the September 11 attacks

References

External links

United Airlines Flight 175
2001 deaths
Participants in the September 11 attacks
Emirati al-Qaeda members
1977 births
Emirati mass murderers
Emirati murderers of children
Emirati expatriates in the United States
People from Khor Fakkan
Suicides in New York City